Never Underestimate the Power of a Woman is the debut album by R&B group Klymaxx. Released in 1981, it was produced by Otis Stokes and Stephen Shockley.  The title is taken from the slogan of Ladies' Home Journal.

Track listing
"All Fired Up"  (Otis Stokes, Stephen Shockley) – 6:19
"I Wish You Would (Tell Me Something Good)"   (Fred, Shockley, Walton, Walton) – 4:38
"I Want to Love You Tonight" 	(Lynn Malsby) – 5:06
"You're the Greatest"  (Stokes, Shockley) – 4:02
"Never Underestimate the Power of a Woman"  (Bernadette Cooper, Cheryl Cooley) – 5:08
"The Beat of My Heart (is for You)"  (Marchbanks, Stokes, Shockley) – 5:48
"No Words"  (Stokes, Shockley) – 4:22
"Can't Let Love Just Pass Me By"  (Stokes, Shockley) – 4:48

Personnel
 Cheryl Cooley – guitar, backing vocals 
 Bernadette Cooper – drums, percussion, backing vocals 
 Robbin Grider – synthesizers
 Joyce "Fenderella" Irby – bass guitar, backing vocals 
 Lynn Malsby – keyboards, backing vocals 
 Lorena Porter Shelby – lead vocals
 Patricia Sylvers – backing vocals 
 Judy Takeuchi – percussion
 Ann Williams – guitar

Production 
 Otis Stokes – producer 
 Stephen Shockley – producer
 Dick Griffey – executive producer 
 Steve Hodge – recording engineer, mixing 
 Taavi Mote – recording engineer 
 Bob Brown – additional engineer
 Sabrina Buchanek – additional engineer
 Wally Traugott – mastering 
 Dina Andrews – A&R coordination
 Henry Vizcarra – art direction
 Jan Kovaleski – design  
 Jay Pope – back cover photo, dust sleeve photography 
 Veronica Sim – photography
 Studios
 Recorded at Studio Masters (Los Angeles, California) and Larrabee Sound Studios (Hollywood, California).
 Mixed at Larrabee Sound Studios
 Mastered at Capitol Records (Hollywood, California).

References

External links
Never Underestimate the Power of a Woman at Discogs

1981 debut albums
Klymaxx albums
SOLAR Records albums